K Maragatham (ta:கே.மரகதம்) (born 27 December 1982) is an Indian politician and Member of Parliament elected from Tamil Nadu. She was elected to the Lok Sabha from Kancheepuram constituency as an Anna Dravida Munnetra Kazhagam (AIADMK) candidate in 2014 election.

She is one of the four women elected from Tamil Nadu; all belong to AIADMK.

Electoral performance

References 

All India Anna Dravida Munnetra Kazhagam politicians
Living people
India MPs 2014–2019
Lok Sabha members from Tamil Nadu
1982 births
People from Kanchipuram district
Tamil Nadu district councillors
21st-century Indian women politicians
21st-century Indian politicians
Tamil Nadu MLAs 2021–2026
Women members of the Tamil Nadu Legislative Assembly